Grant Neil Hattingh (born 3 October 1990 in Johannesburg, South Africa) is a rugby union player who plays as a lock, flanker or eighthman for Japanese sides the  in Super Rugby and Kobelco Steelers in the Top League.

Career

He broke into the Western Province Vodacom Cup team after the completion of the 2012 Varsity Cup and made his provincial debut on 21 April 2012 against the Eagles in Oudtshoorn. Hattingh was a 35th minute replacement for Tyrone Holmes in a 29-14 win for Province.

At the end of 2013, he signed a contract extension to tie him to the Blue Bulls until October 2016.

Kubota Spears

In April 2015, Japanese Top League side Kubota Spears announced the signing of Hattingh for the 2015–16 Top League.

References

External links
 Profile at itsrugby.co.uk
 Youtube Video - Varsity Rugby
 Youtube Video - Blue Bulls Rugby

South African rugby union players
1990 births
Rugby union locks
Rugby union number eights
Living people
Rugby union players from Johannesburg
Lions (United Rugby Championship) players
Western Province (rugby union) players
Bulls (rugby union) players
Blue Bulls players
White South African people
South African people of British descent
Stellenbosch University alumni
Kubota Spears Funabashi Tokyo Bay players
South African expatriate rugby union players
South African expatriate sportspeople in Japan
Expatriate rugby union players in Japan
Sunwolves players
Alumni of Kingswood College (South Africa)